Beaumont-sur-Oise (literally Beaumont on Oise) is a commune in the Val-d'Oise department in Île-de-France in northern France. The classical cellist Jean-Henri Levasseur (1764–1823) was born in Beaumont-sur-Oise.

Population

Notable people
Sébastien Charlier, diatonic harmonica player
Boubacari Doucouré, footballer
Lassana Doucouré, footballer
Presnel Kimpembe, footballer
Louis Mafouta, footballer
Michaël Murcy, footballer
Timothée Pembélé, footballer
Pierre Pucheu, industrialist, fascist, and member of the Vichy government
Adama Traoré, Malian-French man who died due to police brutality

See also
Communes of the Val-d'Oise department

References

External links
Official website 

Association of Mayors of the Val d'Oise 

Communes of Val-d'Oise
Val-d'Oise communes articles needing translation from French Wikipedia